Gaspar is a given and/or surname of French, German, Portuguese, and Spanish origin, cognate to Casper (given name) or Casper (surname).

It is a name of biblical origin, per Saint Gaspar, one of the wise men mentioned in the Bible.

Notable people with the name include:

Mononyms
 Saint Gaspar (54 BC-55 AD), biblical saint
 Gaspar (footballer, born 1981), Odirlei de Souza Gaspar, Brazilian football striker
 Gaspar (Angolan footballer) (born 1997), Kialonda Gaspar, Angolan football defender
 Gaspar (footballer, born 2002), Luis Eduardo Gaspar Coelho, Brazilian football forward

Given name

Gaspar Araújo (born 1981), Portuguese long jumper
Gaspar Azevedo (born 1975), Portuguese footballer
Gaspar Cassadó (1897–1966), Spanish cellist and musical composer
Gaspar Corte-Real (1450–1501), Portuguese explorer
Gaspar Flores de Abrego (1781–1836), three-time mayor of San Antonio, Texas
Gaspar del Bufalo (1786-1837), saint, priest, and founder of the Missionaries of the Precious Blood.
Gaspar DiGregorio (1905–1970), Italian-American organized-crime figure
Gaspar Fagel (1634–1688), Dutch statesman
Gaspar Fernandes (1566–1629), Portuguese musical composer
Gaspar Gálvez Burgos (born 1979), Spanish footballer known simply as Gaspar
 Gaspar Lococo, co-founder of Funtime, Inc.
Gaspar Melchor de Jovellanos (1744–1811), Spanish neoclassical statesman, author, philosopher
Gaspar Méndez (fl. 1546), Spanish architect of Badajoz
Gaspar Méndez de Haro, 7th Marquis of Carpio (1629–1687), Spanish political figure
Gaspar Milazzo (1887–1930), Italian-American organized-crime figure
Gaspar Noé (born 1963), Argentine-born, French-based filmmaker
Gaspar de Portolá (1716–1786), Spanish soldier and politician
Gaspar Saladino (1927–2016), American comic book letterer and logo designer
Gaspar Sanz (1640–1710), Aragonese baroque composer, guitarist, organist and priest
Gaspar Ventura (born 1955), Spanish water polo player
Gaspar Yanga (1545–after 1618), leader of successful 1570 slave revolt in Mexico
Manuel Gaspar Haro (born 1981), Spanish footballer

Surname
Roberto Luís Gaspar Deus Severo, (born 1976), Portuguese footballer known as Beto
Gaspar Pinto (1912–1969), Portuguese footballer
Alexandre-Pierre Gaspar (born 1960), French information architect
Alfredo Rodrigues Gaspar (1865–1938), Portuguese military officer and politician
Boom Gaspar (born 1953), American musician
Chuck Gaspar (1938–2009), American special effects artist
Edu Gaspar (born 1978), Brazilian footballer
Enrique Gaspar (1842–1902), Spanish playwright
Hugo Gaspar (born 1982), Portuguese volleyball player
José Gaspar (also known as Gasparilla), a mythical Spanish pirate supposedly based in southwest Florida during the late 17th and early 18th centuries
Rod Gaspar (born 1946), American Major League baseball player

In fiction
 Gaspar (Chrono Trigger), a character in the 1995 video game Chrono Trigger
 A Muppet character in Barrio Sésamo
 One of the spells in the computer game series Zork
 A planet in the Ratchet & Clank video game series
 Gaspar, a character in the 2012 novel Unholy Night by Seth Grahame-Smith
 Gaspar de la Croix, a character in the video game Assassin's Creed II: Discovery
The title character in Joseph Conrad's story Gaspar Ruiz, adapted for film as Gaspar the Strong Man
Gaspar, a Haunter holding an everstone sent over trade in Snowpoint city, in "Pokémon Diamond", Pokémon Pearl", "Pokémon Platinum", "Pokémon Brilliant Diamond", and "Pokemon Shining Pearl"

See also
 Gáspár, a Hungarian cognate
 Gašpar, a Slavic cognate
 Gaspard (given name), a French cognate
 Gasparilla (disambiguation)

Portuguese masculine given names
Spanish masculine given names
Surnames from given names